TBV Lemgo is a handball club from Lemgo, Germany, and is competing in the Handball-Bundesliga.

History
The ascent to one of the best German handball clubs was slow but steady. In the year the Bundesliga was founded, the club was still in the Oberliga, promotion to the 2. Handball-Bundesliga in 1981/82, and since the 1983/84 season, TBV Lemgo has been playing in the top class, growing steadily for more than a decade. developed into a top team. Names such as Lajos Mocsai (coach since 1989), László Marosi (1990–1999 players) or Daniel Stephan (1994–2008 players) are associated with this. They won their first major title in 1995, winning the DHB-Pokal, followed in 1996 by the EHF Cup Winners' Cup. Lajos Mocsai finished his coaching job at TBV with this title. 1997 was the most successful year in the history of the club, led by his successor, Yuri Shevtsov. For the first time in a season, he was able to celebrate a championship title, a cup win and a Super Cup win. The team won the Handball-Bundesliga twice (1997, 2003), the DHB-Pokal 4 times (1995, 1997, 2002, 2020), the DHB-Supercup 4 times (1997, 1999, 2002, 2003), 1 time for the EHF Cup Winner's Cup (1996) and 2 times for the EHF Cup (2006, 2010).

Crest, colours, supporters

Naming history

Kit manufacturers

Kits

Accomplishments
Handball-Bundesliga:
 : 1997, 2003
DHB-Pokal:
 : 1995, 1997, 2002, 2020
DHB-Supercup:
 : 1997, 1999, 2002, 2003
EHF Cup Winner's Cup:
 : 1996
EHF Cup:
 : 2006, 2010
 Double
 Winners: 1996–97

Team

Current squad
Squad for the 2022–23 season

Technical staff
 Head coach:  Florian Kehrmann
 Assistant coach:  Matthias Struck
 Athletic Trainer:  Meinolf Krome
 Club doctor:  Dr. Roland Kessler

Transfers
Transfers for the 2022–23 season

Joining 
  Urh Kastelic (GK) (from  Frisch Auf Göppingen)
  Samuel Zehnder (LW) (from  Kadetten Schaffhausen)
  Emil Lærke (LB) (from  GOG Håndbold)
  Niels Versteijnen (RB) (from  VfL Lübeck-Schwartau)
  Jan Brosch (P) (from  ASV Hamm-Westfalen)

 Leaving
  Peter Johannesson (GK) (to  Bergischer HC)
  Bjarki Már Elísson (LW)  (to  Telekom Veszprém)
  Andreas Cederholm (RB) (to  IFK Kristianstad)  Linus Geis (LB) (to  DJK Rimpar Wölfe)  Jonathan Carlsbogård (LB) (to  FC Barcelona)''
  Andrej Kogut (CB)

Previous squads

Retired numbers

EHF ranking

Former club members

Notable former players

  Markus Baur (2001–2007)
  Jens Bechtloff (2007–2015)
  Mike Bezdicek (1989–1994, 1995–1998, 2004–2005)
  Sven-Sören Christophersen (2003–2006, 2007–2008)
  Nils Dresrüsse (2011–2016)
  Ulf Ganschow (1994–2003)
  Holger Glandorf (2009–2011)
  Lutz Grosser (1991–2001)
  Hans-Jürgen Grund (1982–1984)
  Michael Hegemann (2006–2008)
  Benjamin Herth (2013–2015)
  Rolf Hermann (2007–2017)
  Fynn Holpert (1989–1991, 1994–1998)
  Tim Hornke (2014–2019)
  Lars Kaufmann (2007–2009)
  Florian Kehrmann (1999–2014)
  Michael Kraus (2007–2010)
  Finn Lemke (2011–2015)
  Carsten Lichtlein (2005–2013)
  Nikolai Link (2010–2012)
  Arne Niemeyer (2015–2016)
  Rainer Niemeyer (1987–1988)
  Hendrik Pekeler (2012–2015)
  Sebastian Preiß (2005–2013)
  Christian Ramota (2001–2005)
  Timm Schneider (2012–2015)
  Achim Schürmann (1994–2003)
  Christian Schwarzer (2001–2007)
  Daniel Stephan (1994–2008)
  Martin Strobel (2008–2013)
  Tim Suton (2014–2015, 2016–)
  Christoph Theuerkauf (2010–2012, 2016–2021)
  Lukas Zerbe (2019–)
  Volker Zerbe (1984–2006)
  Jörg Zereike (2002–2009)
  Patrick Zieker (2012–2019)
  Thomas Bauer (2013–2015)
  Lukas Hutecek (2021–)
  Gennadij Chalepo (1998–1999)
  Andrej Siniak (1996–2001)
  Erwin Feuchtmann (2015–2016)
  Martin Galia (2008–2011)
  Filip Jícha (2005–2007)
  Daniel Kubeš (2008–2010)
  Lasse Boesen (2007–2008)
  Kasper Hvidt (1998–2000)
  Kasper Nielsen (2015)
  Mait Patrail (2011–2012)
  Philippe Julia (1996–1997)
  Sergo Datukashvili (2010–2011)
  Donát Bartók (2015–2019)
  Ferenc Ilyés (2009–2011)
  László Marosi (1990–1999)
  Tamás Mocsai (1989–1996, 2006–2010)
  Logi Geirsson (2004–2010)
  Ásgeir Örn Hallgrímsson (2005–2007)
  Bjarki Már Elísson (2019–2022)
  Vignir Svavarsson (2008–2010)
  Sigurður Sveinsson (1983–1988)
  Avishay Smoler (2010–2012)
  Evars Klešniks (2020)
  Dani Baijens (2018–2021)
  Niko Blaauw (2020–)
  Arjan Haenen (2009–2016)
  Bobby Schagen (2019–)
  Mark Schmetz (2008–2010)
  Fabian van Olphen (2017–2020)
  Piotr Wyszomirski (2016–2020)
  Ionuț Ramba (2015–2017)
  Sergey Pogorelov (1999–2000)
  Azat Valiullin (2016–2018)
  Jaume Fort (1999–2001)
  Gedeon Guardiola (2020–)
  Isaías Guardiola (2018–)
  Marc Baumgartner (1994–1998, 2000–2005)
  Carlos Lima (2002–2004)
  Manuel Liniger (2010–2012)
  Dan Beutler (2015)
  Jonathan Carlsbogård (2018–2022)
  Andreas Cederholm (2019–2022)
  Peter Johannesson (2017–2022)
  Andreas Larsson (1997–1999)
  Jesper Larsson (2009)
  Rickard Lönn (2013–2014)
  Anton Månsson (2015–2017)
  Jonathan Stenbäcken (2015–2017)

Former coaches

References

External links
 Official website

German handball clubs
Handball-Bundesliga
Handball clubs established in 1911
1911 establishments in Germany
Sport in North Rhine-Westphalia